The diocese of Qui Nhơn (also referred to as the diocese of Quy Nhơn;) is a Roman Catholic diocese in central Vietnam. The Bishop is Pierre Nguyên Soan, since 1999; Father Matthieu Nguyen Van Khoi, pastor of Assumption Cathedral in Quy Nhơn and professor at the "Maria Stella" Seminary of Nha Trang, was appointed Coadjutor Bishop-elect of the diocese by Pope Benedict XVI on December 31, 2009. He will be ordained at a later date; as coadjutor bishop to Bishop Soan, he serves as an auxiliary bishop and vicar general of the diocese but also, by canon law, has the right to automatically succeed him upon his death, retirement, or incapacitation.

The creation of the diocese in present form was declared November 24, 1960.

The diocese covers an area of 16,200 km², and is a suffragan diocese of the Archdiocese of Huế.

By 2004, the diocese of Qui Nhơn had about 62,520 believers (1.7% of the population), 70 priests and 36 parishes.

Assumption Cathedral in Quy Nhơn town has been assigned as the Cathedral of the diocese.

Ordinaries

Vicariate Apostolic of Cochin
Erected 1659
Pierre Lambert de la Motte M.E.P. (1658–1679) 
Guillaume Mahot M.E.P. (1680–1684) 
François Perez (1687–1728) 
Alexandre de Alexandris (1728–1738) 
Arnaud-François Lefèbvre M.E.P. (1741–1760) 
Guillaume Piguel M.E.P. (1762–1771) 
Pierre-Joseph-Georges Pigneau de Béhaine, M.E.P. (1771–1799) 
Jean Labartette M.E.P (1799–1823) 
Jean-Louis Taberd M.E.P (1827–1840) 
Etienne-Théodore Cuénot M.E.P (1840–1844)

Vicariate Apostolic of Eastern Cochin
Separated March 2, 1844 The separated entity, Vicariate Apostolic of Western Cochin, would later become the Vicariate Apostolic of Saigon and then the Archdiocese of Saigon. 
Etienne-Théodore Cuénot M.E.P. (1844–1861) 
Eugène-Étienne Charbonnier M.E.P. (1864–1878) 
Louis-Marie Galibert M.E.P. (1879–1883) 
Désiré-François-Xavier Van Camelbeke M.E.P. (1884–1901) 
Damien Grangeon M.E.P. (1902–1924)

Vicariate Apostolic of Quinhon
Renamed December 3, 1924
Damien Grangeon MEP (1924–1929)
Augustin-Marie Tardieu M.E.P. (1930–1942) 
Raymond-Marie-Marcel Piquet M.E.P. (1943–1957)

Diocese of Qui Nhon
Elevated November 24, 1960 
Pierre Marie Pham-Ngoc-Chi (1960–1963)
Dominique Hoàng-Packwagen-Doàn O.P. (1963–1974) 
Paul Huynh Dông Các (1974–1999)
Pierre Nguyên Soan (1999–2012)
Matthieu Nguyên Van Khôi (2012–present)

References

Qui Nhon
Christian organizations established in 1960
Roman Catholic dioceses and prelatures established in the 20th century
Qui Nhon, Roman Catholic Diocese of
1960 establishments in South Vietnam